Mzwandile Moya (born April 16, 1983) known by his stage name as Afrotraction, is a South African R&B and neo soul musician and producer. Moya is coming from a musical family and his love for music was triggered at an early age. Moya is a self-taught pianist and bassist singing in  Siswati in neo soul and R&B styles, and he has worked with many South African artists of different genres.

His studio  album For The Lovers (2014), which earned  him best R&B/Soul/Reggae Album at the 21st South African Music Awards.
Relationships his 5th studio album was released  2017, which includes single; "Ngiphelele", "Ngeke K’lunge", "Ngimtholile",  "Angeke", "Imali Yamalobolo", later became South Africa's  best selling album.

Discography

studio albums

 Soul Deep (2009)
 Soulfully Yours (2011)
 For The Lovers (2014)
 Love & Respect (2016)
 Relationships (2017)
 The Gospel Of Afrotraction: Moya Movement (2020)
 The Launch of JazzYano (2021)
 TBA  (2023)

studio EP's

 Love Over Dose (L.O.D EP) (2019)

Awards

References

1983 births
Living people
South African musicians
People from Mbombela
People from Johannesburg